Presidential elections were held in Colombia on 30 May 1982. The result was a victory for Belisario Betancur of the Conservative Party–National Movement, who received 46.8% of the vote.

Results

References

Colombian presidential election
Colombia
1982 in Colombia
Presidential elections in Colombia